San Sebastián Abasolo is a town and municipality in Oaxaca in south-western Mexico. The municipality covers an area of  km². 
It is part of the Tlacolula District in the east of the Valles Centrales Region.

References

Municipalities of Oaxaca